In Major League Baseball, a shutout (denoted statistically as ShO or SHO) refers to the act by which a single pitcher pitches a complete game and does not allow the opposing team to score a run. If two or more pitchers combine to complete this act, no pitcher is awarded a shutout, although the team itself can be said to have "shutout" the opposing team.

Walter Johnson is the all-time leader in shutouts with 110. Johnson also holds the record for being the only pitcher to throw more than 100 shutouts.

Key

List

See also
Baseball statistics
List of Major League Baseball career wins leaders
List of Major League Baseball career games started leaders
List of Major League Baseball career games finished leaders
List of Major League Baseball career innings pitched leaders

Sources
Baseball-Reference.com

Shutout leaders